The 148th Pennsylvania House of Representatives District is located in Southeastern Pennsylvania and has been represented since 2013 by Mary Jo Daley.

District profile
The 148th Pennsylvania House of Representatives District is located in Montgomery County. It includes the Narbrook Park Historic District. It is made up of the following areas:

 Ambler
 Conshohocken
 Lower Merion Township (PART)
 Ward 01
 Ward 02 
 Ward 12 
 Ward 13 [PART, Divisions 01 and 02]
 Narberth
 Plymouth Township (PART)
 District 01 [PART, Division 02]
 District 03
 District 04
 Whitemarsh Township
 Whitpain Township (PART, Districts 04 and 05)

Representatives

Recent election results

References

External links
District map from the United States Census Bureau
Pennsylvania House Legislative District Maps from the Pennsylvania Redistricting Commission.  
Population Data for District 148 from the Pennsylvania Redistricting Commission.

Government of Montgomery County, Pennsylvania
148